William Thomas Jr. (November 8, 1947 – November 14, 2020) was an American actor. 
From 1991 to 1992, he played Vanessa Huxtable's fiancé Dabnis Brickey on the NBC sitcom The Cosby Show, during the eighth and final season.

Prior to his work on The Cosby Show, Thomas portrayed Cool Charles on the critically acclaimed but short-lived 1987-1988 CBS comedy-drama Frank's Place, which starred Tim Reid and his wife Daphne Maxwell Reid. He also portrayed Det. William Donald Potts on Steven Bochco's widely panned 1990 ABC musical-drama Cop Rock. He also played Mr. Laskin on the "My Big Brother" episode of "Family Matters".

Before coming to Hollywood, he appeared on Broadway in Godspell, Your Arms Are Too Short to Box with God, and as Jacob in the original production of La Cage aux Folles.

Thomas also appeared on The Bold and the Beautiful in 2005 as an INS agent. Movie credits include Mambo Kings, Bruce Almighty, and Christmas with the Kranks.

References

External links
 

1947 births
2020 deaths
African-American male actors
American evangelists
American male television actors
Male actors from Columbus, Ohio
20th-century African-American people
21st-century African-American people